Stańczyk (c. 1480–1560) was a Polish court jester, the most famous in Polish history. He was employed by three Polish kings: Alexander, Sigismund the Old and Sigismund Augustus.

Name, identity and historicity

Scarcity of sources gave rise to four distinct hypotheses in the 19th century: that he was entirely invented by Jan Kochanowski and his colleagues; or that he was "perhaps a typical jester dressed by his contemporaries in an Aesopian attire; or perhaps a Shakespearean vision of 19th century writers; or perhaps indeed a grey eminence of the societatis ioculatorum". In any measure, common consensus among modern scholars is that such a person indeed existed and even if he did not, he had a tremendous importance to Polish culture of later centuries, appearing in works of many artists of the 19th and 20th centuries.

Almost nothing is known about Stańczyk's life and even his name and identity are a matter of dispute. Contemporary sources mention court jesters named Gąska and Stańczyk. Notably, both names are featured in two short poems by Jan Kochanowski. Both words are diminutives, of the words gęś (goose) and Stanisław, respectively, rather than proper names in their own right. All of the above led Aleksander Brückner and later scholars to believe that Gąska and Stańczyk are merely two nicknames of the same person. Because of that hypothesis Stańczyk is sometimes referred to as Stanisław Gąska, a name that resembles a typical Polish name, except it is of much later provenance and was coined in late 19th century rather than during the jester's times.

By any measure Stańczyk's fame and legend were already strong during his own time, the Renaissance. The popularity later reappeared in 19th century and remained well known to present times. Unlike jesters of other European courts, Stańczyk has been always considered to have been much more than a mere entertainer.

He is remembered as a man of great intelligence and a political philosopher gifted with formidable insight into Poland's current and future situation. He used his job to criticize and warn his contemporaries by the use of satire. His witty jokes often pertained to current political or court matters. Stańczyk's remarks and jokes were preserved by numerous contemporary writers and historians, including Łukasz Górnicki, Jan Kochanowski, Marcin Kromer, and Mikołaj Rej who praised him for fighting hypocrisy in the name of truth. Some sources even go as far as to call him a "personal friend to Marcin Kromer, to the dislike of the bishops".

The best known anecdote about Stańczyk is that of a hunting incident. In 1533 King Sigismund the Old had a huge bear brought for him from Lithuania. The bear was released in the forest of Niepołomice near Kraków so that the king could hunt it. During the hunt, the animal charged at the king, the queen and their courtiers which caused panic and mayhem. Queen Bona fell from her horse which resulted in her miscarriage. Later, the king criticized Stańczyk for having run away instead of attacking the bear. The jester is said to have replied that "it is a greater folly to let out a bear that was already in a cage". This remark is often interpreted as an allusion to the king's policy toward Prussia which was defeated by Poland but not fully incorporated into the Crown.

Stańczyk as a symbol 

Stańczyk became a popular historical figure in Polish literature after the partitions (1795). Some writers treated him as a symbol of Poland's struggle for independence, others provided him with rather Shakespearean traits. He appears in a work of, among others, Julian Ursyn Niemcewicz (in Jan z Tęczna. Powieść historyczna, 1825) and several works by Józef Ignacy Kraszewski (1839, 1841).

Teka Stańczyka 

Only five years after the tragic end of the January Uprising, the pamphlets ridiculed the idea of armed national uprisings and suggested a compromise with Poland's enemies, especially the Austrian Empire, and more concentration on economic growth than on political independence. The political faction which adopted these ideas became known as "Stańczycy" (plural of "Stańczyk").

Stańczyk in the arts 
Stańczyk was also one of Jan Matejko's favorite historical figures and he appears in a number of his paintings, such as in the Prussian Homage. Matejko, giving the jester his own facial features, created the popular image of Stańczyk that is familiar to most modern Poles. The painter always depicted Stańczyk with a very concerned and reflective look on his face, in stark contrast to his cap and bells and other jester's gear. Matejko's vision of Stańczyk influenced the way other artists, such as Leon Wyczółkowski, later depicted the jester.

The most notable appearance of Stańczyk in literature is in Stanisław Wyspiański's play Wesele (The Wedding) where the jester's ghost visits the Journalist, a character modeled after , editor of the Kraków-based paper Czas (Time), associated with the Stańczycy faction. In the play, Stańczyk accuses the Journalist, who calls the jester a "great man", of inactivity and passive acceptance of the nation's fate. At the end of their conversation, Stańczyk gives the Journalist his "caduceus" (the jester's marotte) and tells him to "stir the nation" but not to "tarnish the sacred things, for sacred they must remain". Thus Wyspiański reinforced Stańczyk's role as a symbol of patriotism and skeptical political wisdom.

References

Further reading

External links

 Stańczyk, WIEM Encyklopedia
 Andrzej Solarz, Stańczyk, Internetowy Kurier Proszowicki - SERWIS Ziemi Proszowickiej
 Liliana Sonik, "Stańczyk na dworze królowej Bony wobec straconego Smoleńska", Dziennik Polski, 26 April 2010

1480s births
1560 deaths
Jesters
Polish comedians
15th-century Polish people
16th-century Polish people